Český Šternberk is a market town in Benešov District in the Central Bohemian Region of the Czech Republic. It has about 200 inhabitants. It is known for the Český Šternberk Castle, located on the cliffs above the market town.

Geography

It is situated in the Vlašim Uplands.

Český Šternberk lies the bend of the Sázava River. The Blanice forms the southern municipal border and flows into the Sázava.

History
Český Šternberk Castle was founded around 1241 by Zdeslav of Divišov, later known as Zdeslav of Sternberg. The village was founded shortly after as a sub-castle settlement of the castle. The first written mention of the settlement is from 1242 and in 1654, it was first mentioned as a market town. Along with the castle, the village expanded to its present form and in 1901, it became linked by railway, which helped the development of tourism.

Sights
Český Šternberk Castle is the landmark of the market town. It is open to the public.

Notable people
Zdeněk Sternberg (1923–2021), count and owner of the castle; died here

References

External links

Virtual show

Populated places in Benešov District
Market towns in the Czech Republic
Sternberg family